Bad Candy is a 2021 American anthology horror film directed by Scott B. Hansen and Desiree Connell. It stars Zach Galligan, Derek Russo, and Corey Taylor.

Synopsis: Bad Candy follows local Halloween stories of both myth and lessons learned in the community of New Salem. With its annual Psychotronic FM Halloween show, re-enactment radio DJs Chilly Billy and Paul weave the tales of the supernatural of years gone by. In this small town it’s a grimy ending for most, but will a few good souls survive?

Cast
 Zach Galligan as Paul
 Michael Aaron Milligan as Chuck
 Derek Russo as Vince
 Kevin Wayne as Greg
 Kenneth Trujillo as Daryl
 Corey Taylor as Chilly Billy

Release
Bad Candy premiered at the Grimmfest International Festival of Fantastic Film in Manchester, on October 31, 2020. It later screened at the SouthSide Film Festival in Bethlehem, Pennsylvania, in June 2021.

The film is distributed by Dread, and received a limited theatrical release on September 10, 2021. It was released on video-on-demand on September 14, and on Blu-ray on September 28.

Bad Candy was an indie hit at film festivals all over the world winning 26 Best Picture awards and over 93 additional awards.

References

External links
 
https://www.digitalthunderdome.com/badcandy

2020 horror films
American horror anthology films
Halloween horror films
2020s English-language films
2020s American films